This is a list of important publications in geology, organized by field. A number of authors have published lists of influential or notable publications in geology, with an emphasis on papers published before 1950.

Some reasons why a particular publication might be regarded as important:
Topic creator – A publication that created a new topic
Breakthrough – A publication that changed scientific knowledge significantly
Influence – A publication which has significantly influenced the world or has had a massive impact on the teaching of geology.

Foundations

Established the following stratigraphical principles: law of superposition, principle of original horizontality, principle of lateral continuity and the principle of cross-cutting relationships 

First publication to clearly articulate the principle of deep time, and to recognize that rocks record the evidence of the past action of processes which still operate today. These ideas were to grow into the idea of uniformitarianism. Hutton is widely regarded as the "Father of Modern Geology".

Hutton's book is widely regarded as unreadable, and may have remained obscure if not for this work by the brilliant prose stylist John Playfair.

The work's subtitle was "An Attempt to Explain the Former Changes of the Earth's Surface by Reference to Causes now in Operation", and this explains Lyell's impact on science: he was, along with the earlier John Playfair, a major advocate of the then-controversial idea of uniformitarianism; that is, that the Earth was shaped entirely by slow-moving forces acting over a very long period of time. This was in contrast to the antiquated geologic idea of catastrophism, which went hand-in-hand with the age of the Earth suggested by biblical chronology. In various revised editions (twelve in all, through 1872), Principles of Geology was the most influential geological work in the middle of the 19th century, and did much to put geology on a modern footing. Charles Darwin frequently acknowledged his deep debt to this book.

Economic geology
 Lindgren, W. (1933) Mineral Deposits. 930 pp. McGraw-Hill, New York.
For decades Mineral Deposits was the standard textbook for economic geology.

Descriptions of major ore deposits in USA. Updates the earlier Lindgren volume. A basic reference work for economic geologists 
Sillitoe, R.H. (1972). A plate tectonic model for the origin of porphyry copper deposits. Economic Geology, 67 (2): 184–197.
Influential publication in the study of porphyry copper.
Pohl, W.L., 2011. Economic Geology, Principles and Practice: Metals, Minerals, Coal and Hydrocarbons – an Introduction to Formation and Sustainable Exploitation of Mineral Deposits. 663 Pages, Wiley-Blackwell, Oxford.

Geochemistry

Laid the foundations of geochemistry, including the Goldschmidt classification elements.

A highly cited guide to the use of isotope geochemistry in solving geological problems, and the methods involved. Has been cited more than 3200 times. A second edition was published in 1986.  A third edition, with Teresa M. Mensing, was published in 2005, under the title Isotopes: Principles and Applications.

Geochronology

The speech recorded by this volume of Transactions represents the final version of the theory of the age of the Earth which Thomson had been refining since 1862. In it, he proposed that the age of the Earth was "more than 20 and less than 40 million year old, and probably much nearer 20 than 40". His analysis was based on the time it would take the Earth to cool from a completely molten state, and his estimate was consistent with a number of other physical estimates from, amongst others, George Darwin, Hermann von Helmholtz, and Simon Newcomb. This strikingly young age put Thomson in direct conflict with both Uniformitarian geologists and evolutionary biologists, both of whose theories required much longer spans of time to take effect. This paradox of the age of the Earth was resolved only by fuller understanding of the roles of convection and radioactivity in the planet's interior in the early 20th century, and it required understanding of thermonuclear fusion in the Sun developed only in the 1930s to fully explain the stability of the whole solar system over multi-billion year timescales.

With this work based on his thesis Holmes describes the first accurate uranium–lead radiometric dating (specifically designed to measure the age of a rock), assigning an age of 370 Ma to a Devonian rock from Norway, improving on the work of Boltwood who published nothing more on the subject.

 De Geer, G. (1912). A geochronology of the last 12,000 years. Congr. Géol. Int. Stockholm 1910, C.R., 241–253.
In the 1910 International Geological Congress held in Stockholm Gerard De Geer presented to international community his research on glacial lake varves showing that they represented annual layers and were useful in the study of deglaciation.

Geomorphology

In 1837, Agassiz was the first to scientifically propose that the Earth had been subject to a past ice age. This book lays out his theories in print. It represents his theories that vast areas of northern Europe had in the past been covered in ice, extending down to the Caspian and Mediterranean seas. The book represents the birth of the fields of glaciology and glacial geomorphology.

G. K. Gilbert lays the groundwork for many ideas in modern geomorphology, such as the diffusive profiles of hillslopes and the formation of pediments. In addition to its geomorphic significance, it is a description of the last major mountain range to be mapped by Europeans in the contiguous United States. (the Henry Mountains being located in a remote part of Utah) and a description of its formation as a laccolith.

Founding work on karst geomorphology. The study focus on karst phenomena in the Balcans. Albrecht Penck was Cvijić's PhD advisor.

In his 1899 publication William Morris Davis outlines in detail the cycle of erosion model laying the foundations for the study of peneplains, relief development and denudation chronology.

Łozinski, W. (1912). Die periglaziale fazies der mechanischen Verwitterung (in German). Comptes Rendus, XI Congres Internationale Geologie, Stockholm 1910.
In this work Walery Łoziński publishes his presentation at the 1910 International Geological Congress held in Stockholm and establishes periglacial geomorphology as a new field of study.

This work of Walther Penck challenges the cycle of erosion theory of Davis by proposing for the first time a comprehensive alternative model of landscape evolution. The work was published posthumously by his father Albrecht Penck.

With this work Filip Hjulström marks a shift towards quantitative geomorphology and process geomorphology in Sweden and Europe. The publication is founding stone of the Uppsala School of Physical Geography. It influences the Ph.D. students of Hjulström Anders Rapp, Valter Axelsson, Åke Sundborg and John O. Norrman.

Laid the foundations of the scientific investigation of the transport of sand by wind.

In this book King establishes for the first time the major landform of Africa namely the African Surface. Subsequently the concept would be expanded and modified. King did also argued for scarp retreat and pediplanation in the book.

With this publication Linton "stimulated discussion" on the origin of tors. In 1994 it was noted by John Gerrard that the article had been widely cited.

Championed the concept of dynamic equilibrium in geomorphology.

One of the first measurements of chemical erosion and one of the first quantitative assessments on the relative role of chemical and mechanical weathering in cold climates.

An article by Stoddart that proved "devastating" for the field of climatic geomorphology that has been credited as a contributing factor for the decline in the popularity in field the late 20th century.

Widely cited version of the Varnes system of landslide classification first introduced in 1958.

Geophysics

A classic reference on the Earth's magnetic field and related topics in meteorology, solar and lunar physics, the aurora, techniques of spherical harmonic analysis and treatment of periodicities in geophysical data. Its comprehensive summaries made it the standard reference on geomagnetism and the ionosphere for at least 2 decades.

Geotechnical engineering

The book is regarded as the "basis of modern soil mechanics". Inaugurated "the fundamental differential equation necessary to start the procedure of consolidation" and "the theory of effective stresses" that "justify the way in which the soil behaves under load".
Hoek, E. (1994) "Strengths of rock and rock masses" ISRM News Journal, 2(2): 4–16.
Introduced the Geological Strength Index.

Hydrogeology

The work contains the first determination of Darcy's law.

Inferred the fact that both "water and the porous structure" of an aquifer are "elastically compressible".

The work establishes the well function, permitting calculations of transmissivity and storability and from aquifer test data under ideal conditions.

Mineralogy and petrology
 
Systematic treatise of then known minerals and gemstones as well as other rocks, the first since Pliny's Natural History.

"[T]he first modern textbook on mineralogy."

Influential work in petrography.

 The first mapping of "progressive metamorphism through the use of mineral isograds".

Established the concept of metamorphic facies.

Originally published in 1928, it applied the principles of chemistry to petrological problems.

 Considered a benchmark paper in the study of fluid inclusions.

 Considered a benchmark paper in the study of coal petrology.

 Demonstrated experimentally that granite can crystallize from felsic melt. Results are presented in a chemical-mineralogical ternary diagram.

A condensation of Rock-Forming Minerals (1962), a 5-volume comprehensive treatise of the physical, chemical, mineralogical, petrological and optical properties of essentially all minerals with nontrivial abundances to be found in terrestrial rocks. Also presents information regarding common origins and associations of each mineral, as well as a practical commentary on how to distinguish each mineral from others which may appear similar.

First outline of the classification of granite into I and S types.

One of the first outlines of the International Union of Geological Sciences classification of plutonic rocks.

Established the TAS classification of volcanic rocks.

Igneous Petrogenesis has long been a key reference and advanced introductory book to the science of igneous petrology.

Originally published in 1993; presents the thermodynamic basis for modern, quantitative petrology and systematically reviews metamorphism for most rock types. Popularly also known as the "big blue book".

Petroleum geology

Original work on seismic sequence stratigraphy.

Plate tectonics

First book to marshall considerable geological evidence that the continents are mobile relative to each other around the North Atlantic (mainly). It uses Evan Hopkins booklet (On the connection of geology with terrestrial magnetism, 1844), but adapts its data to a plutonist point-of-view.

First book to show geological evidence that some continents were linked with each other: Suess set out his belief that across geologic time, the rise and fall of sea levels were mappable across the earth—that is, that the periods of ocean transgression and regression were correlateable from one continent to another. His theory was based upon glossopteris fern fossils occurring in South America, Africa, and India. His explanation was that the three lands were once connected in a supercontinent, which he named Gondwána-Land (nowadays usually written Gondwanaland). However Suess mistakenly believed that the oceans flooded the spaces currently between those lands.
Moreover, Suess expressed views in this book on the connection between Africa and Europe. Eventually, he concluded that the Alps to the north were once at the bottom of an ocean, of which the Mediterranean was a remnant. Suess was not correct in his analysis, which was predicated upon the notion of "contractionism"—the idea that the Earth is cooling down and, therefore, contracting. Nevertheless, he is credited with postulating the earlier existence of the Tethys Ocean, which he named in 1893.
Suess also introduced in this book the concept of the biosphere, which was later extended by Vladimir I. Vernadsky in 1926.

Die Entstehung der Kontinente und Ozeane was the second book to marshall considerable geological evidence that the continents are mobile relative to each other on the surface of the Earth. His theory was based upon numerous matches between the topography, paleontology and past climate of continents now separated by oceans. At the time of publication his ideas were not taken seriously by most of the geological community as he could not provide a mechanism for continental motion, but his ideas form the foundations of the modern theory of plate tectonics.

 Summarized geological arguments for continental drift, with particular reference to Southern Africa and South America. It is considered a benchmark paper in paleogeography.

"[A] widely circulated report to the Office of Naval Research" [...] that "was the most referenced work in solid earth geophysics in the years 1966-1968". The "paper stimulated intense research and is part of what is the major advance in geologic science of this century."

Sedimentology and stratigraphy

First statement of three fundamental laws of geology: the law of superposition, the principle of original horizontality, and the principle of cross-cutting relationships.

A foundational work in biostratigraphy. "...Cuvier and Brongniart integrated that enriched geognosy with the geohistorical perspective: the structural sequence of formations and their fossils was turned into a temporal sequence or narrative of ecologically distinctive periods punctuated by occasional sudden changes".

The first geological map covering such a large area in detail, and is one of the first stratigraphical analyses to utilize paleontological indices. A rough sketch of the map was drawn in 1801 possibly influencing Alexandre Brongniart when he visited England in 1802.

Argument for the existence and relevance of deep sea deposist on land which had until then been rejected by influential geologists.

The basis for the widely used folk classification for clastic and carbonate rocks

Provided new evidence and revived interest for the Precambrian world-wide glaciations.

Structural geology

"one of the first reports of an attempt to scale deformation experiments on a rock-analogue material (clay) and to conduct detailed kinematic and strain analyses of the three end-member types of faulting (thrust, normal, and strike-slip)".

Expanded on Ernest Masson Anderson's earlier (1905) "recognition of the surface boundary condition of zero shear stress".

Began a whole school of structural geology that used the techniques of continuum mechanics to understand rock structures.

Widely cited publication on the microstructure of mylonites. It is credited for contributing to a transition in tectonic structural geology towards a kinematic approach.

Much cited reference work in microtectonics.

Paleontology

A definitive multi-authored work of some 50 volumes, written by more than 300 paleontologists, and still a work in progress. It covers every phylum, class, order, family, and genus of fossil and extant (still living) invertebrate animals. Raymond C. Moore was the founder and first editor.

 
and 

With these two publications Adolf Seilacher established the concept of ichnofacies.

Seismology
 The first scientific paper written by a woman and published in the Transactions of the Geological Society, London. 

Defined a version of elastic anisotropy using transversely isotropic media that could be analyzed through the use of Thomsen parameters. Most cited paper in the history of geophysics.

Tectonics

An influential review of fault properties, dynamics and growth, how they fail, and how this links to seismology. Highly cited (>2700 citations).

The first paper to lay out the now widely accepted model for formation of sedimentary basins by tectonic stretching of the lithosphere (mechanical thinning), followed by lowering of the basin by the cooling of upwelled, hot asthenosphere at depth below it (isostatic deepening). Highly cited (>2200 citations).

Volcanology
Plinius Caecilius Secundus, Gaius (Pliny the Younger)(97–112). Letters of Pliny the Younger, Book Six, 16 and 20.
Contains the first detailed description of a volcanic eruption in western culture – the eruption of Mount Vesuvius in what is now known as a plinian eruption in 79 CE.

Summarized scientific knowledge obtained from the 1902 eruption of Mount Pelée.

The 1980 eruption of Mount St. Helens in Washington state, USA, allowed volcanologists to document first hand a large number of volcanic processes which hitherto had been only inferred. It spurred a revitalization of the whole discipline of volcanology. This anthology of papers was amongst the first to present new data gained during the eruption.

See also 
 History of geology
 List of geologists
 List of geophysicists
 List of mineralogists

References

External links

Geology literature
Publications
Publications in geology
Publications in geology
Geology
Geology books